Ruhi Dilip Singh (born 12 October 1995) is an Indian actress, former Miss India and model who primarily appears in Hindi films and television. Singh has appeared in Emmy-nominated documentary The World Before Her and acclaimed web series Chakravyuh and Runaway Lugai. She was recently spotlighted among the top 10 of The Times' "50 Desirable Women of 2020" list.

She was handpicked in 2014, by Femina Miss India to represent India at the Internationally. She began her acting career by starring at the drama film Calendar Girls (2015). Most recently, she was nominated for the Filmfare OTT Awards 2021 for Best Actor (Female) for her role in the series - Runaway Lugaai.

Early life and background
Ruhi Singh was born and brought up in Jaipur, Rajasthan, India.

Career
Singh's early dream was to become a successful singer. In the year 2011, she joined the modelling industry. She participated in Femina Miss India East 2011, the preliminary for Femina Miss India contest and was crowned 1st Runner up. The same year she entered Indian Princess 2011 and was chosen to represent India at Miss Model of the World 2011 contest held in China, where she placed amongst the top 36 quarter finalists. In 2012 she participated in Femina Miss India and was placed in the top 10. Later that year, Singh represented India at Miss United Nations in 2012 held at Miami. But the real success came in 2014, when she was handpicked by Femina Miss India to represent India Internationally. Singh worked in a documentary, The World Before Her. Singh was named one of the Top 25 Most Desirable Women in India (2014), by The Times of India. Most recently, Singh sored to the top of Times Most Desirable Women 2020, featuring at number 9 and will be headlining Netflix's upcoming original show 'Social Currency' slated for worldwide release in early 2022.

Singh was spotted by Madhur Bhandarkar as he was impressed by a Canadian documentary she had done. He immediately signed her as one of his five leading ladies in his film Calendar Girls. The movie got released on 25 September 2015. The story of Calendar Girls focuses on five girls who hail from different regions of India, and who have been selected to pose for the country's most prestigious annual calendar which is a joint effort between business tycoon Rishabh Kukreja and his photographer friend Timmy Sen.

In 2021, Singh garnered rising popularity and critical acclaim for her pivotal roles in MX Player's latest releases: Chakravyuh and Runaway Lugai. Both series met with instant popular reception with charting at the No.1 spot within the first week of their release and were quick to become some of the most viewed Indian web series of the year. Topping off its commercial success, the series bagged a Filmfare nomination for the Best Series at the 2021 Filmfare OTT Awards.

Singh, while describing her performance in Chakravyuh said "My role in Chakravyuh was layered and I tried to retain the raw intensity it needed.".

In Runaway Lugaai, a gripping and entertaining drama series, Singh's performance as 'Bulbul' - a bold, small town runaway bride was not only critically acclaimed but was also extremely well received by the viewers. Singh, in an interview remarked "There was this sense of purpose and adrenaline pulsing through me, and I was mentally cheering on my character who so bravely decided to make an unconventional choice." Singh also bagged a Filmfare nomination for her portrayal as Bulbul.

With over 12 million followers across Instagram, Facebook and Josh, Ruhi is among the few critically acclaimed artists with an influencer fan mass online. Her latest stint with success comes with her new show: ‘The greatest of all time with Ruhii Siingh’.  Through her one of a kind global Snapchat release, Singh has made her presence felt amongst the youth.

Media 
Singh was ranked in The Times Most Desirable Women at No. 25 in 2014, at No. 23 in 2015, at No. 36 in 2016, at No. 41 in 2017, at No. 43 in 2018, at No. 9 in 2020.

Music videos

Filmography

Films

Web series

References

External links

 
 

Living people
Indian film actresses
Actresses in Hindi cinema
21st-century Indian actresses
Female models from Rajasthan
Actresses in Tamil cinema
Actresses from Jaipur
1993 births